Vértessomló is a village in Komárom-Esztergom County, Hungary.

On January 29, 2011 a moderate earthquake struck below Vértessomló. 26 damage cases have been reported in the greater epicenter area. It was essentially light damage like cracks in walls and fallen chimneys. The earthquake had a magnitude of 4.3 at a shallow focal depth of 5 km. People in Vértessomló and in Oroszlány ran into the streets and stayed there for a couple of hours because of the fear for aftershocks. The earthquake was well felt in Budapest.

External links 
 Street map (Hungarian)
 Moderate earthquake below Vértessomló on January 29 2011

Populated places in Komárom-Esztergom County